Men Who Have Made Love to Me is a 1918 American silent biographical film starring Mary MacLane, based on her book I, Mary MacLane (1917), and directed by Arthur Berthelet. The film was produced by early American filmmaker, George K. Spoor.

Cast
Mary MacLane as herself
Ralph Graves as The Callow Youth
Paul Harvey as The Literary Man (as R. Paul Harvey)
Cliff Worman as The Younger Son
Alador Prince as The Prize Fighter
Clarence Derwent as The Bank Clerk
Fred Tiden as The Husband of Another

Plot
The story of six affairs of the heart, drawn from controversial feminist author Mary MacLane's 1910 syndicated article(s) by the same name, later published in book form in 1917. None of MacLane's affairs - with "the bank clerk," "the prize-fighter," "the husband of another," and so on - last, and in each of them MacLane emerges dominant. Re-enactments of the love affairs are interspersed with MacLane addressing the camera (while smoking), and talking contemplatively with her maid on the meaning and prospects of love.

Technical Innovations
This film represents the earliest recorded breaking of the fourth wall in serious cinema, as the enigmatic authoress - who portrays herself - interrupts the vignettes onscreen to address the audience directly. This film is also the first in which writer, star, narrator, and subject are unified.

Preservation status
It is not known whether the film currently survives, and Men Who Have Made Love to Me is now thought to be a lost film.

References

External links

 
 Mary MacLane's Silent Film Men Who Have Made Love to Me - The Mary MacLane Project

1918 films
American silent feature films
American biographical drama films
American black-and-white films
1918 drama films
1910s biographical drama films
1910s American films
Silent American drama films